Macropus is a marsupial genus in the family Macropodidae. It has two extant species of large terrestrial kangaroos. The term is derived from the Ancient Greek μάκρος, makros "long" and πους, pous "foot". Thirteen known extinct species are recognised. The type species is the eastern grey kangaroo.

Taxonomy
In 2019, a reassessment of macropod taxonomy determined that Osphranter and Notamacropus, formerly considered subgenera, should be moved to the genus level. This change was accepted by the Australian Faunal Directory in 2020.

Extant Species

Fossils
A currently-unnamed Pleistocene Macropus species from Australia was the largest kangaroo ever, with an estimated mass of around 274 kg (~604 lb).
 †Macropus dryas
 †Macropus gouldi
 †Macropus narada
 †Macropus piltonensis 
 †Macropus rama
 †Macropus woodsi
 †Macropus pavana
 †Macropus thor
 †Macropus ferragus
 †Macropus mundjabus
 †Macropus pan
 †Macropus pearsoni
 †Macropus titan (or †Macropus giganteus titan)

References

Further reading

External links

Macropods
Marsupials of Australia
Marsupial genera
Taxa named by George Shaw
Extant Miocene first appearances

bs:Macropus
eo:Makropo
eu:Macropus
gl:Macropus
jbo:Macropus
sr:Macropus